Larrauri is a quarter in Mungia (Basque Country) and a surname. Notable people with the surname include:

José Larrauri (born 1940), Spanish footballer
José María Larrauri Lafuente (1918–2008), Spanish Bishop of the Roman Catholic Church
Juanita Larrauri (1910–1990), Argentine singer and politician
Oscar Larrauri (born 1954), Argentine Formula One driver
Pier Larrauri (born 1994), Peruvian footballer